(born August 23, 1992) is a Japanese former figure skater. She won the silver medal at the 2010 Merano Cup.

Programs

Competitive highlights

References

External links 
Japan Skating Federation official results & data site

Japanese female single skaters
1992 births
Living people
Sportspeople from Hiroshima